Lassie is an American television series that follows the adventures of a female Rough Collie dog named Lassie and her companions, both human and animal. The show was the creation of producer Robert Maxwell and animal trainer Rudd Weatherwax and was televised from September 12, 1954, to March 25, 1973. The seventh longest-running U.S. primetime television series after The Simpsons, Law & Order: Special Victims Unit, Gunsmoke, Law & Order, Family Guy and NCIS, the show ran for 17 seasons on CBS before entering first-run syndication for its final two seasons. Initially filmed in black and white, the show transitioned to color in 1965.

Production

Narration 
Wrather's wife, Bonita Granville Wrather, who was the series' associate producer, narrated numerous episodes throughout the run of the series, usually the beginning and/or ending of multi-part episodes.

Writers 
Many early episodes were written by Robert Maxwell under the pseudonym Claire Kennedy. In later years, the writing partnership of Robert Schaefer and Eric Freiwald was responsible for over 150 episodes. They were also responsible for developing the idea of having Lassie with a forest ranger.

Theme music 
Lassie used several pieces of theme music during its long broadcast history. For the first season, "Secret of the Silent Hills (Theme from the Lassie TV series)", is used for both the opening and ending theme. Composed by William Lava, the orchestral theme was originally created for the 1940 radio show The Courageous Dr. Christian.

For the second and third season a variation of this theme, titled simply "Lassie Main & End Title", was used for the opening and ending theme. Raoul Kraushaar, the music director for the series, is the listed composer for the theme; however the changes he made to the original are so slight that only a trained ear can tell the difference. The third theme used for the series is an orchestral rendition of the aria, "Dio Possente" (Even Bravest Hearts May Swell) from Charles Gounod's opera, Faust. The exact time this theme started being used is uncertain due to conflicting records; however it is agreed that it was the third series, and was used for at least part of season four for the change of ownership of Lassie.

The most famous of the Lassie theme songs appeared at the start of the fifth season. Copyrighted as "Lassie Main & End Title", the song was created by Les Baxter, with the whistling itself performed by Muzzy Marcellino. Nicknamed "The Whistler," it remained the series theme for the rest of the "Martin years". With the coming of the "Ranger years", the opening and ending theme was changed to an orchestral version of "The Whistler". With the coming of the "Alone" years, and continuing throughout the ranch/Holden family years the theme was changed again, this time  to Nathan Scott's arrangement of the traditional folk tune Greensleeves, which become the series theme  song for the rest of its run. For the final two seasons, the familiar closing visual of Lassie standing on a hill and lifting her paw, was replaced by the credits on a green background, and flashing from one slate to the other instead of scrolling as in most of the series run. Television composer Nathan Scott scored the music to nearly every episode between 1963 and 1973, except for four episodes.

Plot and themes 

The first 10 years of the series saw Lassie living on a farm, first with the Miller family (Jeff, his mother Ellen, and her father George - who was called "Gramps" by Jeff). Season 4 saw the Millers taking in young orphan Timmy, who then lived with them on the farm, as well as the unexpected death of Gramps, (reflecting the real life death of actor George Cleveland, who played the character), and with that the Millers moved off the farm, but Timmy and Lassie would stay behind with his new foster parents, Paul and Ruth Martin, who also took over the farm.  All 10 of the Miller/Martin farm years would for the most part focus on "boy and his dog" adventures with Jeff or Timmy getting involved in some sort of trouble, and Lassie eventually coming to the rescue.

Seasons 11–16 were the "Ranger years" of the series, as Lassie (because she was not able to go to Australia with the Martins when Paul got a job teaching agriculture there) was taken in by U.S. Forest Ranger Corey Stuart (who appeared in a few episodes of season 10) and began to work with the U.S. Forest Service.  Color filming was exploited during the Ranger years with Lassie and her friends sent to exotic locations such as Sequoia National Forest and Monument Valley, creating miniature travelogues for viewers.  Other rangers would be featured during the latter part of this era when Robert Bray (who played Stuart) left the series.

For season 17, the program shifted gears again and became somewhat of an anthology series, with Lassie traveling on her own, getting into different adventures each week (similar in format to The Littlest Hobo).  No explanation was given as to why Lassie was no longer with the Forest Service.  Some episodes during this final CBS season were animals-only.

During seasons 18 and 19 (with the series having moved to first run syndication), Lassie was taken in by Garth Holden (played by Ron Hayes) who was in charge of the Holden Ranch – a home for orphaned boys – which he ran with his college-age son and his friend.  This (somewhat) brought the show back to its roots by giving Lassie a farm/ranch home base, which is where she settled in for the final two years of the series.

Episodes

Characters and cast

Human leads

1954–1957: Miller Family (Jeff's Collie) 
 Ellen Miller – war-widowed farm woman (Jan Clayton)
 Jeff Miller – Ellen's eleven-year-old son (Tommy Rettig)
 George "Gramps" Miller – Ellen's father-in-law and Jeff's paternal grandfather (George Cleveland)
 Sylvester "Porky" Brockway – a farm boy and Jeff's friend (Joey D. Vieira – using the stage name "Donald Keeler")
 Constable Clay Horton – the sheriff (Richard Garland)

1957–1964: Martin Family (Timmy & Lassie) 
 Timmy Martin – a foster boy on the Miller farm (Jon Provost)
 Paul Martin – a young farmer, Ruth's husband and Timmy's adoptive father  (Jon Shepodd 1957–1958; Hugh Reilly 1958–1964)
 Ruth Martin – Paul's wife and Timmy's adoptive mother (Cloris Leachman 1957–1958; June Lockhart 1958–1964)
 Petrie J. Martin – Paul's uncle (George Chandler) (1957–1959)
 Cully Wilson – a neighbor of the Martins, who was a farmer and nature lover (Andy Clyde) (1959–1964)
 Ralph "Boomer" Bates – a neighbor of the Martins who owned a dog named Mike and was Timmy's best friend (Todd Ferrell) (1958–1959)
 Scott Richards, another of Timmy's friends (Kelly Junge Jr.) (1958)

1964–1970: U.S. Forest Service 
 Forest Ranger Corey Stuart (Robert Bray) (1964–1968)
 Assistant Forest Ranger Hank Whitfield (Clyde Howdy) (1964–1966)
 Forest Ranger Bob Erickson (Jack De Mave) (1968–1970)
 Forest Ranger Scott Turner (Jed Allan) (1968–1970)

1970–1971: Traveling on her own 
 No human leads

1971–1973: Holden Ranch 
 Garth Holden – director of the Holden Ranch (Ron Hayes)
 Ron Holden – Garth's son (Skip Burton)
 Dale Mitchell – Ron's friend (Larry Wilcox)
 Keith Holden – Garth's brother (Larry Pennell)
 Lucy Baker – a deaf child living near the Holden Ranch (Pamelyn Ferdin)

Dog actors as Lassie 
 Pal (Pilot episodes)
 Lassie Junior (1954–1959)
 Spook (1960)
 Baby (1960–1966)
 Mire (1966–1971)
 Hey Hey (1971–1973)

Media information

Broadcast history 
First-run Lassie was televised September 12, 1954 to March 24, 1973 with its first 17 seasons airing on CBS Sundays at 7:00 p.m. EST. In 1971, in order to promote community-related programming among local affiliates, the Federal Communications Commission moved primetime Sundays to 8:00 P.M. EST with the institution of the Prime Time Access Rule. CBS executives felt Lassie would not be well received in a time slot other than its traditional 7:00 p.m. slot, and, with the network's other family programs set, the show was canceled. (Lassie was among several shows that CBS canceled during this time period as part of a change in its target demographics.) Lassie then entered first-run syndication with Jack Wrather and Campbell's Soup still on board, and remained on the air for another two years with its final episode airing in March 1973. All totaled, 591 episodes were produced.

An animated reworking, Lassie's Rescue Rangers, followed in fall 1973, immediately after the original series ended (the pilot movie aired in 1972 while the live-action series was still on the air). Lassie's Rescue Rangers was denounced by both Weatherwax and the National Association of Broadcasters, the latter of which made note of the animated series' "violence, crime and stupidity."

Later series 
In 1973, ABC created an animated Saturday-morning animated program called Lassie's Rescue Rangers produced by Filmation.

In 1989, what was essentially a sequel series, The New Lassie – featuring Jon Provost as Steve McCullough – aired in first-run syndication. In its seventh episode ("Roots"), June Lockhart reprised her Ruth Martin role when Steve McCullough is revealed to be the adult Timmy Martin.  It is revealed that Timmy was never properly adopted by the Martins and consequently was forced to remain in the U.S. when Ruth and Paul emigrated to Australia.  Timmy was then subsequently adopted by the McCullough family and began going by his middle name Steven. In 1992, Tommy Rettig made a guest appearance in the final episode, "The Computer Study". This would be his last television appearance prior to his death in 1996.

In 1997, a modified remake – also called Lassie – debuted, airing in the U.S. on the then new Animal Planet cable network.  This show (which was filmed in Canada and set in Vermont) also revolved around a boy named Timmy and his dog, though differences in setting and character circumstances precluded it from being an exact remake of the original series.

DVD releases 
The series was released to DVD between 2001–2007.

Comics 
The TV series was adapted into a comic book by Dan Spiegle, distributed by Gold Key Comics.

Reception

Ratings 
Every year of its 17-year run on CBS, Lassie placed first in its time slot, Sunday 7:00 P.M. EST, and often ranked among the top 25 shows on television. The show's highest ranking years in the Nielsen ratings were the Martin years when the show placed #24 in 1957, #22 in 1958, #15 in 1959, #15 in 1961, #21 in 1962, #13 in 1963, and #17 in 1964. The only Martin year Lassie did not climb into the top twenty-five was 1960, when it ran opposite Walt Disney Presents on ABC and Shirley Temple Theater on NBC. However, Lassie still ran opposite Disney when the Disney anthology television series moved to NBC in 1961, and still managed to climb into the Top 25. With the advent of the Forest Service seasons, the show began a steady decline in ratings.

Awards and honors 
(All awards listed given during the time of, or specifically related to the TV series)
 Two-time Emmy Award winner for Best Children's Program (1955, 1956)
 1956 Peabody Award
 Three stars on the Hollywood Walk of Fame (Lassie – 1960, June Lockhart – 1960 for television, Jon Provost – 1994)
 1967 U.S. Department of Agriculture Conservation Award (awarded to Lassie for promoting conservation during the series' Forest Service era)
 Timmy Martin's shirt, jeans, and Keds displayed at the Smithsonian Institution

Cultural impact 

Jon Provost called his autobiography Timmy's in the Well! because a well was the one place Timmy never fell into—abandoned mine shafts, off cliffs, into rivers, lakes, and quicksand, but never a well.

Mad parodied the show as "Lizzy", where it was revealed that the collie was actually a circus midget in a dog suit, while the real Lizzy was a dimwitted mutt.
In an episode of The Flintstones ("Dino Goes Hollyrock"), the character Dino wins an appearance on the smash hit TV show "Sassie" starring a heavily made-up and snobby girl dinosaur and her Lassie-like adventures.

Belgian comics artist Willy Vandersteen created his own version of the TV show with a collie named Bessy in 1954. Apart from the fact that his comic strip starred the same dog breed with a similar name, it had little to do with the series overall, since the comic was a Western comic.

References 
 Notes

 Footnotes

 Works cited

 
 
 
 
 
 
 
 
 
 
 
 

 Bibliography

External links 

 Lassie's official website 
 Lassie's Twitter page
 

1954 American television series debuts
1950s American children's television series
1960s American children's television series
1970s American children's television series
1973 American television series endings
American children's adventure television series
American children's drama television series
Black-and-white American television shows
CBS original programming
Emmy Award-winning programs
English-language television shows
Farms in fiction
First-run syndicated television programs in the United States
Lassie television series
Peabody Award-winning television programs
Super Bowl lead-out shows
Television shows based on American novels
Television shows based on British novels
Television series about families
Television shows set in California
Television shows about dogs
Television series by Universal Television
Television shows adapted into films
Television shows adapted into comics
Television shows set on farms